Rick Gulyas (born 15 December 1952 in Welland, Ontario) is a Canadian former ski jumper who competed in the 1972 Winter Olympics, held in Sapporo, Japan, finishing in 48th position (out of either 56 or 62 competitors - sources disagree) in the men's individual small hill competition.  Worldwide, his final standing in the 1971–72 season was 78th overall.
Rick is also known as a competitor in International Freestyle skiing events as an aerialist. He made 1st place finishes in Men's Aerials in a number of competitions in Canada and the US. In addition to his Nordic jumping skills, he also a capable inverted-jump aerialist in Freestyle skiing. (Further editing and information requested)

References

1952 births
Living people
Canadian male ski jumpers
Olympic ski jumpers of Canada
Ski jumpers at the 1972 Winter Olympics